Gajić or Gajic is a gender-neutral Slavic surname that may refer to
Aleksa Gajić (born 1974), Serbian comics artist and film director
Daniela Nuțu-Gajić (born 1957), Romanian-Australian chess player
Dragan Gajić (born 1984), Slovenian handball player
Goran Gajić (born 1962), Serbian film, television, and theater director
Ivan Gajić (born 1979), Serbian handball player
Marko Gajić (born 1992), Serbian football defender 
Milan Gajić (footballer, born 1986) (born 1986), Serbian football player 
Milan Gajić (footballer born 1996), Serbian football player 
Nenad Gajic (born 1983), Canadian lacrosse player 
Zoran Gajić (born 1958), Serbian volleyball coach